Viola beckwithii, known commonly as the Great Basin violet, Beckwith's violet, and sagebrush pansy, is a species of violet native to the western United States. It is an early-flowering plant of sagebrush (Artemisia tridentata) habitats in the Great Basin region.

This is a perennial herb with several decumbent or erect stems growing from a caudex. The stems are up to about 22 centimeters long, often with much of their length underground. The fleshy compound leaves have dissected leaflets of varying shape and size. Flowers arise from the leaf axils. The upper two petals are reddish violet, and the lower three are purplish to white with purple veining and yellow or orange bases.

See also
Sagebrush steppe
Northern Basin and Range ecoregion
Central Basin and Range ecoregion

References

External links 
Viola beckwithii. Calflora 2013.
Viola beckwithii. CalPhotos.

beckwithii
Endemic flora of the United States
Flora of the Great Basin
Flora of the Sierra Nevada (United States)
Flora of the Western United States